180° may refer to:

 180 degrees, the arc of a semicircle
 180°, an album by Gerardo (musician), 2004
 180 Degree (MC Mong album), 2004
 "180 Degrees", a song by NOFX from So Long and Thanks for All the Shoes, 1997
 U-turn or 180 degree turn

See also 

 
 
 
 180 (disambiguation)
 180-degree rule
 180 Degrees South: Conquerors of the Useless, a documentary
 180th meridian
 Reverse (disambiguation)
 1800 (disambiguation)